Gregbrownia hutchisonii is a species of flowering plant in the family Bromeliaceae, native to northern  Peru. It was first described by Lyman Bradford Smith in 1966 as Tillandsia hutchisonii.

References

Tillandsioideae
Flora of Peru
Plants described in 1966